Kris Rampersad is a writer, researcher, lecturer, journalist, publisher, activist and advocate from Trinidad and Tobago.

Biography

Rampersad was born in rural Trinidad. She started her career as a freelance journalist at the San Fernando office of the Trinidad Guardian, before being called three months later to join the staff of the Port of Spain headquarters, where she has worked in various capacities as reporter of health, education, culture and politics.

She has written Guardian columns such as "Discover Trinidad and Tobago", "Teenlife", "Environment Friendly", "In Gabilan", "I Beg to Move", "The Week That Was", and "The C Monologues", as Literarily.

She served as editor of its U Magazine and Sunday Guardian. She covered most of the Jamaat al Muslimeen coup attempt involving activities at Trinidad and Tobago Television for the Guardian during July 1990. She was one of the founding journalists at Newsday.

Education

Rampersad was the first sitting journalist/editor in the Caribbean to hold a PhD. She completed her PhD at the University of the West Indies following a bachelor's degree in which she earned first-class honours.

Awards and fellowships

Rampersad holds awards in Journalism (BWIA Media Awards for Excellence in Journalism - Social and Economic Commentary and Pan American Health Journalism Award for Excellence in Health Reporting.

She received a Nuffield Foundation Press Award at Wolfson College, Cambridge University, the Foreign Press Centre of Japan Fellowship and a Government of India ITEC Scholarship to the Indian Institute of Mass Communication where she received its highest, the Rajasthan Patrika Award. She also received a Commonwealth Professional Fellowship and is considered a Commonwealth Gender Scholar.

In 2018, Rampersad won the National Medal (Gold) for Distinguished Contributions to the Development of Women/Journalism.

Educator

Rampersad is a pioneer and specialist scholar and educator about the intersection of education, media and culture in the world of new media. She has worked on media strategies for the Commonwealth Foundation and the Caribbean Institute of Agricultural Research and Development, and pioneered the Excellence in Agricultural Journalism Award of 2010. She has prepared, presented and published numerous papers on media, culture and gender including at Caribbean Cultural Diversity to UNESCO, Commonwealth Diversity Conferences, and Arcade/Acted.

Rampersad facilitated the training of multisectoral communities in Belize, Jamaica, Grenada and elsewhere in Intangible Cultural Heritage and community capacity development and preparation of dossiers for UNESCO World Heritage.

Rampersad was President of the UNESCO Education Commission, Vice President of the  Subsidiary Body of the UNESCO Intergovernmental Committee on Intangible Cultural Heritage, and Vice President of the Commonwealth Journalist Association.

She founded, with Nobel laureate Derek Walcott, the Trinidad Theatre Workshop Fund for Literature, Drama and Film.

Books

Rampersad has written several books. The first, Finding A Place: IndoTrinidadian Literature (Kingston, Jamaica: Ian Randle Publishers, 2002) explores the groundbreaking arena of society-formation and the socio-cultural, economic and political adaptations of early colonial migrants as well as the relationship between journalism and fiction in West Indian literature, tracing antecedents to the works of authors such as Seepersad Naipaul, V. S. Naipaul, Samuel Selvon, Ismith Khan and Dennis Mahabir,. The book is a ground-breaking study that gives context to much of V. S. Naipaul's perspectives on colonialism, the Caribbean and Trinidad and Tobago, placing his writings within the context of some 200 years' gestation in Trinidad and its peculiar social, economic, political and literary evolution. Rampersad argues that the society's complex oral and literary antecedents propelled his acclamation as a 20th-century Lord of the English language and that early experiences of journalism on the island experienced by him and his predecessors, including his father Seepersad Naipaul, legislator/authors as F. E. M. Hosein, Dennis Mahabir, and near contemporaries such as Samuel Selvon and Ismith Khan, influenced their leanings towards expanding the literary tradition in social realism tradition.

Sir Vidia S. Naipaul himself commended the publication as revealing much about his father. 

In Finding a Place, Rampersad challenges and rejects the notion of the term "East Indians" to describe people in Indian heritage in the Caribbean, and traces their migration and adaptation from hyphenated isolation inherent in the description Indo-Trinidadian or Indo-Caribbean for the unhyphenated integration into their societies as IndoTrinidadian and IndoCaribbean that embraces both their ancestral and their national identities.

Rampersad is also the author of Through the Political Glass Ceiling - Race to Prime Ministership by Trinidad and Tobago's First Female, which examines the role of gender, culture and rurality in the success of Kamla Persad-Bissessar as the first female Prime Minister of Trinidad and Tobago in the country's general elections of 2010.

Rampersad also wrote and published LiTTscapes - Landscapes of Fiction from Trinidad and Tobago. This was the official commemorative publication of the Jubilee/50th anniversary of the independence of Trinidad and Tobago. It captures Trinidad and Tobago's literary heritage up to the time of the Jubilee of Independence with photographic representations of towns, villages, cultures, festivals, landscapes, and nature, and more than 100 works of fiction. It has received widespread critical acclaim. It is associated with LiTTeas, LiTTours and LiTTributes, all of which are available on request Rampersad's GLoCal Knowledge Pot, a platform for education and interconnected heritage at krisrampersad.com.

In August 2019, Rampersad released her line of children's fiction with Festival Fables, with I the Sky & Me the Sea, The Adventures of Munnie Butterfly & Danny Dragonfly, Book 1.

See also
 Non-resident Indian and Person of Indian Origin
 Indo-Trinidadian and Tobagonian

References

External links
  https://krisrampersad.com

Indian diaspora in Trinidad and Tobago
Living people
Trinidad and Tobago journalists
Trinidad and Tobago women journalists
Trinidad and Tobago columnists
Trinidad and Tobago women columnists
Women educators
Year of birth missing (living people)
Trinidad and Tobago people of Indian descent